"Get It Off" is a song by American recording artist Monica. It was written by rapper Missy Elliott, Craig Brockman, and Herbert Jordan, and produced by the former along with DJ Scratchator and Brockman for Monica's fourth studio album, After the Storm (2003). The song is built around a sample of "Set It Off" (1984) by  American electro and old school hip hop group Strafe.  Due to the inclusion of the sample, Steve Standard is also credited as a songwriter. The uptempo also features guest vocals by rapper Dirtbag.

The song was released as the album's second single on a double A-side single with "Knock Knock", also produced by Elliott. While "Get It Off" failed to chart within the US Billboard Hot 100, its That Kid Chris Remix, produced by Chris Staropoli, peaked at number 13 on the component Dance Club Songs chart. A portion of "Get It Off" was incorporated as a dance break into the music video for "Knock Knock", filmed by director Chris Robinson in Miami, Florida on in mid-late July 2003.

Track listings

Notes
 denotes co-producer(s)
 denotes additional producer(s)
Sample credits
"Get It Off" contains a sample from the composition "Set It Off" (1985) by Strafe.
"Knock Knock" contains excerpts from the composition "It's a Terrible Thing to Waste Your Love" (1976) by The Masqueraders.

Credits and personnel
Credits adapted from the liner notes of After the Storm.
 Marcella Araica – audio engineering
 Monica Arnold – lead vocals, background vocals
 Carlos Bedoya – recording
 Tom Coyne – mastering
 Missy Elliott – production, additional vocals 
 Scott Kieklak – mixing

Charts

References

External links
 Monica.com — official Monica site
 Monica music videos — watch "Knock Knock/Get it Off" at LAUNCHcast

2003 singles
Monica (singer) songs
Songs written by Missy Elliott
Songs written by Craig Brockman
2003 songs
J Records singles
Dance-pop songs